James Simon Ayong (born in a cave in Kumbun, West New Britain in 1944 – 5 April 2018) was the Anglican Archbishop of Papua New Guinea from 19 June 1996 to 2009.

He was the first prelate in the church of Papua New Guinea to come from elsewhere in the country than the eastern Papuan heartland of the country's Anglican Church. Ayong served as a parish priest in rural and metropolitan Papua New Guinea and, unusually among indigenous Papua New Guinean clergy, studied overseas, in England. At the time of his birth Australian New Guinea (the northern half of eastern New Guinea and the New Guinea Islands) was under occupation by the forces of Japan during World War II and Japanese forces and Papuan tribesman sympathetic to the Japanese cause had recently executed the New Guinea Martyrs.

Education
In 1982, James Ayong earned his diploma in Theology from Newton College, in Papua New Guinea. He would earn a Bachelor of Theology from Martin Luther Seminary, in Lae. Martin Luther Seminary is a joint clergy-training venture of the Evangelical Lutheran Church of Papua New Guinea and the Gutnius Lutheran Church of Papua New Guinea. He earned his Master of Arts degree from Chichester Theological College, in England, in 1994.

Career
 Local Government Officer
 Purchasing Officer and Radio Operator for the Anglican Diocesan Office in Lae, 1976–1980
 Ordination training at Newton College, 1980–1982
 Assistant priest, Lae, 1982–1987
 Lecturer in Old Testament Studies and Theology, Newton College, 1987–1989
 Principal, Newton College, 1989–1993
 Chichester Theological College, England, 1993–1994
 Parish Priest of Gerehu, 1994–1995
 Bishop of Aipo Rongo, 1995-2009
 Archbishop of Papua New Guinea 1996-2009

Death
Ayong died in Kimbe hospital on 5 April 2018.

See also

Anglican Church of Papua New Guinea

References

External links
Profile of Ayong

1944 births
2018 deaths
Alumni of Chichester Theological College
Anglican archbishops of Papua New Guinea
Papua New Guinean Anglicans
People from West New Britain Province
Anglican bishops of New Guinea
Anglican bishops of Aipo Rongo